Erikssonia is a genus of butterflies in the family Lycaenidae. They are found on sandy substrates, though E. edgei appears to be found on more loamy sand than its congeners. They are slow fliers.

Species
There are four species:
Erikssonia acraeina Trimen, 1891 – Eriksson's copper
Erikssonia bouyeri Gardiner, 2012 
Erikssonia cooksoni Druce, 1905 – Cookson's copper 
Erikssonia edgei Gardiner & Terblanche, 2010 – Waterberg copper

References

External links
"Erikssonia Trimen, 1891" at Markku Savela's Lepidoptera and Some Other Life Forms

 
Lycaenidae genera
Taxa named by Roland Trimen